Armando Dionisi (born 11 October 1949 in Canterano) is an Italian politician, and was elected to the Italian Chamber of Deputies in the 2006 General election.

Previously he was a Member of the European Parliament for the Central region with the Cristiani Democratici Uniti, Member of the Bureau of the European People's Party and sat on the European Parliament's Committee on Transport and Tourism.

He was a substitute for the Committee on Agriculture and Rural Development, a member of the Delegation for relations with the Mashreq countries and a substitute for the Delegation for relations with the Maghreb countries and the Arab Maghreb Union (including Libya).

Career
 1992-1993: Regional Vice-Secretary of Democrazia Cristiana - Lazio
 1998-2002: Regional Secretary of the CCD
 since 2002: Regional Secretary of the UDC and member of the national executive

Education
 from 1988 to 1990: Director of Coldiretti (farmers' association) of Rome from 1982 to 1990 and Mayor of Canterano
 1994: From 1990 to 1995 member of Lazio Regional Council and member of Regional Executive with responsibility for staff and labour policy
 from 2000 to 2004: Member of the Lazio Regional Executive with responsibility for town planning and housing
 Head of the UDC-SVP delegation in the EPP-ED Group in the European Parliament

See also
 2004 European Parliament election in Italy

External links
 

1949 births
Living people
People from the Metropolitan City of Rome Capital
Christian Democracy (Italy) politicians
Christian Democratic Centre politicians
Union of the Centre (2002) politicians
Deputies of Legislature XV of Italy
Deputies of Legislature XVI of Italy
Politicians of Lazio
Union of the Centre (2002) MEPs
MEPs for Italy 2004–2009